SS Tuscania was a luxury liner of the Anchor Line, a subsidiary of the Cunard Line and named after Tuscania, Italy. In 1918 the ship was torpedoed and sunk by the German U-boat  while transporting American troops to Europe with the loss of 210 lives.

Operations
Tuscania carried passengers between New York City and Glasgow while in service with the Anchor Line, on a route that had previously been assigned to her sister ship Transylvania. On its first trip to Glasgow, Tuscania was captained by David Bone, who was also a popular novelist of maritime adventures  based on his life experiences. She continued to run this route even as World War I broke out in Europe in August 1914 and Germany initiated a submarine campaign against merchant shipping in waters near the United Kingdom.

Tuscania made international headlines for rescuing passengers and crew from the burning Greek steamer SS Athinai on 20 September 1915. In 1916, Tuscania was refitted and pressed into service as a troopship. She made the news again in March 1917 by evading a submarine and a suspected Imperial German Navy armed merchant cruiser.

Final voyage and sinking
On 24 January 1918, Tuscania departed Hoboken, New Jersey, with 384 crew members and 2,013 United States Army personnel aboard. On the morning of 5 February 1918, she turned south for the North Channel en route Liverpool. The German submarine  sighted Tuscania′s convoy during the day, and stalked it until early evening. Under the cover of darkness around 6:40 pm, the submarine's commanding officer, Korvettenkapitän Wilhelm Meyer, ordered two torpedoes fired at Tuscania. The second of these struck home, sending her to the bottom of the Irish Sea within about four hours. Tuscania sank nearly three years to the day after her maiden voyage as a passenger liner. Some of the U.S. Troops were rescued by an Irish fishing boat as well.

Many of the bodies of the drowned servicemen washed up on the shores of Islay and were buried there. The police sergeant at Bowmore, Malcolm McNeill, the maternal grandfather of NATO general secretary (1999 - 2004) George Robertson, had said of local people in his official report: 'though they had so little, they gave so much to help those who were wrecked on their shores' and he wrote back to all those raising enquiries from America on family members lost on Tuscania (and in the 1918 HMS Otranto sinking).

After the First World War, many were reinterred in Brookwood Military Cemetery or repatriated to the United States. Just one grave is left on the island today. In 1919, the American government and American Red Cross unveiled a tower as a permanent memorial,  for those lost on Tuscania and Otranto, on the southern-most tip of Islay, the Mull of Oa.

Notable passengers
Harry R. Truman, who later died in the 1980 eruption of Mount St. Helens
Sydney Brooks, British critic (survived sinking)
Leonard Read, founder of Foundation for Economic Education (survived sinking) 
Matthew B. Juan, First Arizonian to Die In WW1 (survived sinking)

Army units on board
 100th Aero Squadron 
 158th Aero Squadron
 213th Aero Squadron  
 32nd Infantry Division (United States)  
 20th Engineer Regiment
 357th Infantry  
 165th Depot

References

External links
 Tuscania, an American History 
  20th Engineer Regiment in World War 1
 100th Aero Squadron - History
 158th Aero Squadron - History
 213th Aero Squadron - History
 Collection of Tuscania related photographs

Ocean liners
Ships of Scotland
Ships sunk by German submarines in World War I
1914 ships
World War I shipwrecks in the Atlantic Ocean
Maritime incidents in 1918